The Noricum scandal, or Noricum affair was an Austrian arms export scandal centering on the illegal export of weapons to Iran, by VOEST subsidiary Noricum during the 1980s. It was named after the Roman geographical area Noricum.

See also
Noricum Maschinenbau und Handel, based in Liezen, company involved in manufacturer of the arms
GC-45 howitzer, armaments product exported illegally
Alfred Worm, journalist involved in uncovering the scandal

References

Military scandals
Corporate scandals
1980s in Austria
Arms control
Weapons trade
Foreign relations during the Iran–Iraq War
Scandals in Austria